Marion Shimmin  (née Fallows) was elected in 1933 as the first woman member of the House of Keys representing the constituency of Peel, Isle of Man. She replaced her husband, Christopher R. Shimmin, who died in January 1933. Both Marion and Christopher were MHKs representing the Manx Labour Party.

References

Members of the House of Keys 1929–1934
Members of the House of Keys 1934–1946
Manx women in politics
20th-century British women politicians